Beruk Asfaw (born 5 June 1960) is a retired male boxer from Ethiopia.  He represented his native country at the 1980 Summer Olympics in Moscow, Soviet Union in the light flyweight division. There he lost to Antti Juntumaa of Finland (– 48 kg) after 66 seconds of the first round.

1980 Olympic record

 Round of 16: lost to Antti Juntumaa (Finland) by second-round knockout

References

Sports Reference

External links
 

Olympic boxers of Ethiopia
Living people
1960 births
Ethiopian male boxers
Light-flyweight boxers
Boxers at the 1980 Summer Olympics
Place of birth missing (living people)